The Wilaya of Ain Guezzam is a newly created province in far southern Algeria that was created on December 18, 2019, after the Cabinet of Algeria passed a bill that created 10 new provinces in a rare move. Prior to that there was no creation of provinces in Algeria for 35 years. In Guezzam is the southernmost and least populous province of Algeria, as it lies along the border with Niger, and has a population of 11,202 in the present boundaries during the 2008 census. The capital of the province is also called Ain Guezzam as all Algerian provinces are required to be named after their capitals.

History 
The province was approved on May 27, 2015. The province was confirmed on November 26, 2019, and implemented the following month. Prior to 2019 it was part of Tamanrasset Province.

Administrative divisions
The province consists of 2 daïra of which both are coextensive with the 2 communes which are In Guezzam with a population 7,045 in 2008, and Tin Zaouatine with a population of 4,157 in 2008. The boundaries of the province are exactly the same as the old In Guezzam District that was part of Tamanrasset Province.

References

External links
 https://www.joradp.dz/FTP/JO-FRANCAIS/2019/F2019078.pdf
 http://www.aps.dz/en/algeria/32006-10-administrative-districts-promoted-into-provinces-with-full-prerogatives
 http://www.ons.dz/collections/w11_p1.pdf
 :de:In Guezzam (Provinz)
 :ar:ولاية عين قزام
 :fr:Wilaya d'In Guezzam

 
Provinces of Algeria
States and territories established in 2019
Tuareg